Kodimaniyanda Madappa Ashwath Aiyappa (18 November 1983 – 17 April 2014) was an Indian cricketer. He played three first-class matches for Karnataka in 2001/02. He drowned while trying to save his brother in a reservoir.

References

External links
 

1983 births
2014 deaths
Indian cricketers
Karnataka cricketers
Cricketers from Bangalore
Deaths by drowning in India